Cynthia Adobea  (born 1 August 1990) is a Ghanaian footballer who plays as a defender for the Ghana women's national football team. She was part of the team at the 2014 African Women's Championship. At the club level, she played for Reformers Ladies in Ghana.

See also
List of Ghana women's international footballers

References

1990 births
Living people
Ghanaian women's footballers
Ghana women's international footballers
Place of birth missing (living people)
Women's association football defenders